Ivan Lukyanovich Solonevich (13 November 1891, Ciechanowiec, then Grodno Governorate, Imperial Russia — 24 April 1953, Montevideo, Uruguay) was a Russian philosopher, historian, writer, editor, publisher, publicist and conservative political activist.

A member of the White movement during the Russian Civil War and later of the anti-Soviet underground in Ukraine, Solonevich was persecuted and jailed. He spent 1920s and early 1930s as a sports official, photographer and journalist, all the while looking for the opportunity to leave the country. After several failed attempts he finally succeeded in 1934 and spent the rest of his life in emigration, first in Finland, then Bulgaria, Germany, Argentine (where he founded the newspaper Nasha Strana, Our Country) and Uruguay.

Solonevich authored several acclaimed books on Russian monarchy (The Assassins of the Tzar, 1938; The Myth about Nicholas the Second, 1949) and political repressions in the USSR (Russia in Concentration Camp, 1935). His best-known work is People's Monarchy (1951) in which he fully developed his doctrine of monarchy being the only viable and historically justified political system for Russia.

Bibliography

Translations
Die Verlorenen. — 5. Auf. — Essen: Essener-Verlag, 1937. (German)
The Soviet Paradise Lost. — New York: The Paisley Press, Inc, 1938. (English)
Russia in Chains. — London: Williams and Norgate Ltd, 1938. (English)
Het "proletarische" paradijs Russland een concentratiekampf. — Den Haag: W. P. Van *Stockum & Zoon N. V, 1937. (Dutch)
Rosja w obozie koncentracyjnym. — Lwow: Nakladem Sekretariatu *Porozumiewawczego Polsckich Organizacyi Spolecznych we Lwowie, 1938. (Polish)
Rusko za mřížemi — Praha: Prapor Ruska, 1936. (Czech)
 Russija u konclogoru / Urednik dr. J. Adric. — Zagreb: Knjiznica dobrich romana, 1937. 
 Иван Солоњевич. Народна монархиjа/Превод Зоран Буљīuћ. – Београд: Центар за изучавање Традициjе «Укрониjа», 2014  (Serbo-Croatian)

References

External links
 The Works by Solonevich at Lib.ru, the online Moshkov library
 The Last Knight of the Empire. 2014 film by Sergey Debizhev (YouTube, 1 h 20 min)

1891 births
1953 deaths
People from Ciechanowiec
People from Belsky Uyezd (Grodno Governorate)
Russian nationalists
Russian monarchists
People of the Russian Civil War
White movement people
Soviet defectors
White Russian emigrants to Germany
20th-century Russian journalists
Burials at The British Cemetery Montevideo